Anthony Flanagan (born 11 April 1972 as Tony Bonello) is an English actor most widely known for his portrayal of policeman Tony in Channel 4's comedy-drama series Shameless.

Biography
Flanagan was born in Stockport, Cheshire. At school he was called Anthony Bonello. After leaving Grange Comprehensive School, in Oldham, he worked as a joiner. At 16 he went to London, taking on occasional odd jobs and for a time slept on the streets. Flanagan has described this as "a very bad period". Flanagan decided to become an actor after seeing a friend of his sister perform at RADA.

Flanagan studied at Oldham College and Capitol Theatre in Manchester (now Manchester Metropolitan University} after a year of unemployment. Flanagan's first professional job was in a lead role at the RSC (Royal Shakespeare Company) in the 2001/02 season, playing Pat Harford in Peter Whelan's play A Russian in the Woods. (Flanagan would later reflect on the experience of appearing on stage naked.) This led to a collaboration with writer and theatre critic Richard Edmonds on a one-man show on the life of Baudelaire entitled King of a Rainy Country.

Notable work includes roles series in Shameless, Vincent, Cracker (where his roles as Kenny Archer in the 2006 TV film was almost universally praised despite mixed critical reaction to the comeback show itself), Life on Mars, Foyle's War, All About George, Casualty, Holby City, The Bill, Spooks, Spooks: Code 9, Doctor Who, Survivors and Red Riding. He played his first major lead role in the short serial Instinct, broadcast in February 2007 and was due to appear in the West End in Glengarry Glen Ross in October 2007 but withdrew due to 'personal reasons'.

Flanagan appeared in the BBC TV docudrama Heroes and Villains as Spartacus, first broadcast in 2008. He breaks the character of 'virile Roman hero' and appears full of doubt, irascible and Shakespearean. The series was successful in Europe and the United States, and was noted for the credibility of its historic sources. He took on the role of villain Dexter in BBC's Survivors (2009–10); the character is killed in series 2 episode 3 (BBC later announced that the shooting of season 3 would be cancelled). In 2009 he played the dogged but doomed journalist Barry Gannon in Red Riding; set in 1974, it is the first film in the Red Riding Trilogy. Initially a Channel 4 series, the trilogy has been successful all over the world, and regularly featured on the European film festival circuit, winning many awards. Flanagan was scheduled to appear in the film Acts of Godfrey, which filmed in early 2010; however, he didn't appear due to theatre commitments. He briefly appears in Glorious 39 (2009), a British production written and directed by Stephen Poliakoff.

2010 was the year of Flanagan's theatre comeback. The ex-RSC came to the [C]] for a new adaptation of Chekhov's Cherry Orchard beside Josie Lawrence, where his performance was very well received.

In 2011, Flanagan played the role of Steve in Life on the Line, a short film by Jamie Donaghue.

He also played in ITV's BAFTA award-winning drama Appropriate Adult as Mike playing opposite Emily Watson, who won a BAFTA for Best Leading Actress for her role as Janet Leech in the same film.

In 2012 Flanagan appeared as Fergus in Series 4 of Being Human.
He then appeared as Andy in Julie Gearey's Prisoners' Wives, a BBC One drama about how women deal with life after their husbands and families are sent to prison.

Also in 2012 Flanagan returned as a Detective Chief Inspector in BBC One's Silent Witness to play D.C.I. Ronson.

In 2012 Flanagan worked and appeared in three films:
He plays the Recruiting Sergeant in Private Peaceful, based on Michael Morpurgo's novel of the same name, which was adapted for the screen by Simon Readeand and was directed by Pat O'Connor.
He appears in Kadri Kousaar's film The Arbiter as Mickey.
He played the title role in Klaus Huttmann's feature film The List.

Flanagan plays Arnold Hankin, a self-made successful businessman, in The Village, broadcast on BBC One in 2013 and 2014 – an epic drama charting the turbulent times of one English village. The six-part series was directed by Antonia Bird, who directed Flanagan once before in Cracker, and also by Gillies MacKinnon.

Flanagan can be seen in Jimmy McGovern's Moving On and in the second series of Shetland, shown on BBC One in 2014.

Personal life
He is married to actress Rebekah Staton.

Select filmography
Shameless (2004–06), Tony
Life on Mars (2006), Pete Bond
Cracker (2006), Kenny Archer
Instinct (2007), D.C.I. Thomas Flynn
Doctor Who (2007), Orin Scannell
Heroes and Villains (2007–08), Spartacus
Coming Up (2008), Sirjad
Red Riding (2009), Barry Gannon
Survivors (2008–10), Dexter
New Tricks (2011), Anthony Bassett
Life on the Line (2011), Steve
Appropriate Adult (2011), Mike
Being Human (2012), Fergus
Prisoners' Wives (2012), Andy
Silent Witness (2012), Ronson
Private Peaceful (2012), Recruiting Sergeant
The Arbiter (2012), Mickey
The List (2013), Chris Corwin
The Village (2013), Arnold Hankin
Moving On (2013), Greg
Shetland (2013), Euan
In The Flesh (2014)
The Crown (2016)
Wild Bill (2019), PC Sean Cobley
Around the World in 80 Days (2021), Thomas Kneedling
House of the Dragon (2022), Ser Steffon Darklyn

References

External links

Anthony Flanagan's profile at Hobson's International Voice Overs
Anthony Flanagan Official Website 

1972 births
Living people
Actors from Stockport
Alumni of Manchester Metropolitan University
English male television actors